Patrick Pihana Branco (born April 28, 1987) is an American lawmaker and a member of the Democratic Party who served as the State Representative for District 50 (Kailua and Kāne‘ohe Bay) on the island of Oʻahu. He was elected in November 2020.

Prior to his time in the Hawaiʻi State House of Representatives, Branco worked as a U.S. Diplomat in Colombia, Pakistan, Venezuela and Washington, D.C. He entered the U.S. Foreign Service through the Congressman Charles B. Rangel Graduate Fellowship program.  He was the first Rangel Fellow from Hawaiʻi and the first Native Hawaiian selected for the program.

Early life 
Born and raised in Kailua, Hawai‘i, Branco graduated from Kamehameha Schools in 2005 and then from Hawai‘i Pacific University, where he received a BA in International Relations and Political Science.  Branco received a full scholarship as a Presidential Scholar and served as Student Body President.  Additionally, Branco received a Work and Study Fellowship from Sogang University in Seoul, where he studied Korean language and completed a fellowship at LG Electronics Legal Foreign Affairs.  He then studied at Johns Hopkins University School of Advanced International Studies, graduating with a Master's of International Relations focusing on International Economics and Korea Studies.

Branco has described his grandmother as a major influence in his life.

Career prior to politics 
Following his graduation from Johns Hopkins University, Branco served as a U.S. diplomat for seven years including assignments in Pakistan, Colombia and Venezuela. Domestically, he worked in the Office of the Special Representative for Afghanistan and Pakistan and the Secretary of State's Operations Center.

Branco speaks Spanish and has working knowledge of Korean and Hawaiian.

Political career 
Prior to elected office, Branco held multiple positions in community organizations. These include being on the Board of Directors for the AAPI Progressive Action, Board of Directors for the Conference on Asian Pacific American Leadership, vice-president of the Asian American Foreign Affairs Association, the Communications Chair of the Pickering & Rangel Fellows Association, a member of the Kailua Hawaiian Civic Club, a member of the Koʻolaupoko Hawaiian Civic Club, a member of the Royal Order of Kamehameha, a member of Hale ʻo Nā Aliʻi, and a member of the Chamber of Commerce Hawai‘i Young Professionals Program.

Branco announced his candidacy for the Hawaiʻi House of Representatives in December 2019. Branco won against Republican Kanani Souza 61.3% to 38.7%.

References

1987 births
21st-century American politicians
Candidates in the 2022 United States House of Representatives elections
Living people
Democratic Party members of the Hawaii House of Representatives